Sadiq Onifade, known popularly known as WurlD, is a Nigerian singer and songwriter. Born in Lagos, Nigeria, WurlD relocated to Atlanta, Georgia to pursue a secondary education and record music. He describes his style of music as electro-fusion. He released his debut EP Evolution in 2013.

Early life
Born in Lagos, Nigeria, WurlD relocated to the US as a teenager and received his college education at Georgia State University, studying computer science. While in school, WurlD developed a serious interest in musical performance.

Career 
In late 2012, WurlD released his first single, "Beyond Our Dreams" from his debut EP titled Evolution, due summer 2013. Coinciding with the release, SESAC held an exclusive listening party at their Atlanta office for WurlD's forthcoming Evolution EP. By early 2013, WurlD was in the recording studio with Mario, writing songs for the R&B superstar's upcoming album. Shortly after, the music video for Evolution's second single, "Alive", produced by Black Shield Entertainment producer Hood Beatz, was premiered exclusively via MTV: The Wrap Up on 2 May 2013. WurlD also teamed up with Timbaland's artist, BK Brasco as a featured artist on "Beautiful Girls." He also appears in the song's video.

In May 2016 WurlD released "Show You Off" an Afro-soul record featuring Walshy Fire of Major Lazer and Afro-beat producer Shizzi. In June 2016 WurlD released the collaborative track "Better Days" with Sir Felix; it became the official anthem for DelfSail 2016.
WurlD (Sadiq Onifade) co-wrote the hit song "Blow my Mind" by Davido featuring Chris Brown in 2019. The song was produced by Davido's long time collaborating producer Shizzi.

Awards and recognition

In 2015 WurlD went certified Gold with his Sony Music release track "Follow You" with Polish DJ, Gromee and in 2017, he received a nomination for Best Diaspora Act at the Nigerian Entertainment Award alongside Rotimi and Wale. He has a Hit single now called 'Trobul'

Discography

Extended plays

Singles

Guest appearances

Awards and recognition

References

External links 
 Official site

1987 births
Living people
Musicians from Lagos
Nigerian soul musicians
Nigerian male pop singers
Nigerian male singer-songwriters
21st-century Nigerian male singers
Yoruba musicians
Nigerian expatriates in the United States